Thomas C. "Tommy" Wright, Jr. (born April 27, 1948) is an American politician. Since 2001 he has served in the Virginia House of Delegates, representing the 61st district in the Southside Virginia counties of Amelia, Cumberland, Mecklenburg and Nottoway, plus part of Lunenburg County. He is a member of the Republican Party.

Wright has served on the House committees on Agriculture (2001), Agriculture, Chesapeake and Natural Resources (2002–), Claims (2001), Conservation and Natural Resources (2001), Counties, Cities and Towns (2001), General Laws (2002–), Militia and Police (2001), and Militia, Police and Public Safety (2002–).

Early life, education
Wright was born in Richmond, Virginia. He graduated from Victoria High School in 1966, and received a B.A. degree in political science from Old Dominion University in 1970.

Electoral history
Wright was elected to the Lunenburg County Board of Supervisors in 1993 and 1997. He served as chairman 1995–1997.

State Senator Richard J. Holland died on April 16, 2000. He was succeeded in office by 61st district Delegate Frank Ruff, who won a special election on November 7, 2000. Wright received the Republican nomination to replace Ruff, and won the seat in another special election on December 19.

Wright voted against a bill to eliminate a law banning sexual intercourse before marriage in the 2020 legislative session. The bill passed 91-5 with bipartisan support in the house.

Notes

External links
 (campaign finance)

1948 births
Living people
Republican Party members of the Virginia House of Delegates
Old Dominion University alumni
People from Victoria, Virginia
Politicians from Richmond, Virginia
County supervisors in Virginia
21st-century American politicians